Netechmodes gravidarmata is a species of moth of the family Tortricidae. It is found in Ecuador in the provinces of Loja and Tungurahua.

The wingspan is 20 mm. The ground colour of the forewings is cream, slightly mixed with brownish and suffused with yellowish brown except for the dorsal and subterminal areas. The hindwings are white cream, but cream terminally.

Etymology
The species name refers to the heavily sclerotisation of the female genitalia and is derived from Latin gravic (meaning heavy) and armatus (meaning armed).

References

Moths described in 2009
Euliini